Slaughtered Ox, also known as Flayed Ox, Side of Beef, or Carcass of Beef, is a 1655 oil on beech panel still life painting by Rembrandt. It has been in the collection of the Louvre in Paris since 1857. A similar painting is in Kelvingrove Art Gallery and Museum, Glasgow, possibly not created by Rembrandt himself but probably by one of his pupils, perhaps Carel Fabritius.  Other similar paintings by Rembrandt or more likely his circle are held by museums in Budapest and Philadelphia.  

The work follows in a tradition of artworks showing butchery, for example Pieter Aertsen's A Meat Stall with the Holy Family Giving Alms (1551) and Annibale Carracci's Butcher's Shop (c. 1583), and perhaps more specifically Joachim Beuckelaer's Slaughtered Pig (1563).  Rembrandt made a drawing of a similar scene c. 1635.  Another pre-1655 painting of a slaughtered ox (the example in Edinburgh, now attributed to Rembrandt's circle but formerly to Rembrandt) was perhaps inspired by a lost earlier work by Rembrandt himself.  In northern Europe, November was traditionally the time for slaughtering livestock, before winter made feed difficult to find.  

The painting measures , and is signed and dated "Rembrandt f. 1655".  It shows the butchered carcass of a bull or an ox, hanging in a wooden building, possibly a stable or lean-to shed.  The carcass is suspended by its two rear legs, which are tied by ropes to a wooden crossbeam.  The animal has been decapitated and flayed of skin and hair, the chest cavity has been stretched open and the internal organs removed, revealing a mass of flesh, fat, connective tissue, joints, bones, and ribs.  The carcass is carefully coloured, and given texture by impasto.  In the background, a woman appears behind a half-open door, lifting the painting from still life into a genre painting, a scene of everyday life.  It is sometimes considered a vanitas or memento mori; some commentators make references to the killing of the fatted calf in the biblical story of the Prodigal Son, others directly to the Crucifixion of Jesus.

The painting was possibly owned by Christoffel Hirschvogel in 1661. It was viewed by Joshua Reynolds in the collection of Pieter Locquet in Amsterdam in 1781, and later owned by Louis Viardot, who sold it to the Louvre in 1857 for 5,000 francs.

The work's muscular depiction inspired Honoré Daumier, Eugène Delacroix, a series of works by  Chaïm Soutine, and Francis Bacon.  Most particularly, Bacon's Figure with Meat depicts Pope Innocent X, as painted by Velazquez, accompanied by ghostly echoes of the carcass from Rembrandt's painting.

Gallery

References

 
 Le Boeuf écorché, Louvre 
 The slaughtered ox, Rembrandt database
 A Corpus of Rembrandt Paintings V: The Small-Scale History Paintings, 2011., edited by Ernst van de Wetering, p.551-562 
 Rembrandt van Rijn, 1606-1669, Carcass of Beef (Flayed Ox), 1655, Don Gray
  Bloom: Rembrandt, Red Meat, and Remembering the Flesh, Lisa Deam, The Cresset, Trinity 2007 (Vol LXX, No. 5, p 6-13)
Avigdor W.G. Posèq: A Proposal for Rembrandt's Two Versions of Slaughtered Ox, Artibus et Historiae, Vol. 30, No. 60 (2009), pp. 271-276, Cracow, 2009.
 Smith, Baige Elise: Rembrandt`s Anatomy Lessons, diss., The University of Western Australia, 2010.
 Niels Bergervoet Rembrandt and the Slaughtered Ox, 2011.
 Margaret D. Carroll: The Blade and the Brush: Rembrandt's Slaughtered Ox and Anatomy of Doctor Deyman, Oxford Art Journal 40(3), 2017., str.347-369
Alison M. Kettering: After Life: Rembrandt’s Slaughtered Ox, Artibus et Historiae, 79 (XL), 2019., 267-286

External sources
Rembrandt's Flayed Ox Explained

Paintings by Rembrandt
1665 paintings
Paintings in the Louvre by Dutch, Flemish and German artists
Still life paintings
Animal paintings
Animal killing
Cattle in art
Paintings about death